The Isle of Man (War Legislation) Act 1939 (2 & 3 Geo.6 c.86) was an Act of the Parliament of the United Kingdom that permitted any part of UK legislation related to defence to be extended to the Isle of Man directly by Order in Council, bypassing Tynwald.

A similar act, the Isle of Man (War Legislation) Act 1914, had been in force for the duration of the First World War.

References

United Kingdom Acts of Parliament 1939
Manx law